Somerville is a city located directly to the northwest of Boston, and north of Cambridge, in Middlesex County, Massachusetts, United States. As of the 2020 United States Census, the city had a total population of 81,045 people. Somerville was established as a town in 1842, when it was separated from Charlestown. In 2006, the city was named the best-run city in Massachusetts by The Boston Globe. In 1972, 2009, and 2015, the city received the All-America City Award. It is home to Tufts University, which has its campus along the Somerville and Medford border.

History

Early settlement
The territory now comprising the city of Somerville was first settled by Europeans in 1629 as part of Charlestown. In 1629, English surveyor Thomas Graves led a scouting party of 100 Puritans from the settlement of Salem to prepare the site for the Great Migration of Puritans from England. Graves was attracted to the narrow Mishawum Peninsula between the Charles and Mystic rivers, linked to the mainland at the present-day Sullivan Square. The area of earliest settlement was based at City Square on the peninsula, though the territory of Charlestown officially included all of what is now Somerville, as well as Medford, Everett,  Malden, Stoneham, Melrose, Woburn, Burlington, and parts of Arlington and Cambridge. From that time until 1842, the area of present-day Somerville was referred to as "beyond the Neck" in reference to the thin spit of land, the Charlestown Neck, that connected it to the Charlestown Peninsula.

The first European settler in Somerville of whom there is any record was John Woolrich, an Indian trader who came from the Charlestown Peninsula in 1630, and settled near what is now Dane Street. Others soon followed Woolrich, locating in the vicinity of present-day Union Square.  In 1639 colonists officially acquired the land in what is now Somerville from the Squaw Sachem of Mistick. The population continued to slowly increase, and by 1775 there were about 500 inhabitants scattered across the area. Otherwise, the area was mostly used as grazing and farmland. It was once known as the "Stinted Pasture" or "Cow Commons", as early settlers of Charlestown had the right to pasture a certain number of cows in the area.

John Winthrop, the first colonial governor of the Massachusetts Bay Colony, was granted  of land in the area in 1631. Named for the ten small knolls located on the property, Ten Hills Farm extended from the Cradock Bridge in present-day Medford Square to Convent Hill in East Somerville. Winthrop lived, planted, and raised cattle on the farm. It is also where he launched the first ship in Massachusetts, the "Blessing of the Bay". Built for trading purposes in the early 1630s, it was soon armed for use as a patrol boat for the New England coast. It is seen as a precursor to the United States Navy. The "Ten Hills" neighborhood, located in the northeastern part of the city, has retained the name for over 300 years. New research has found that less than a decade after John Winthrop moved to the farm in 1631, there were enslaved Native American prisoners of war on the property. Each successive owner of Ten Hills Farm would depend upon slavery's profits until the 1780s, when Massachusetts abolished the practice.

In a short time, the settlers began laying out roads in all directions in search of more land for planting and trade with various Native American tribes in the area. Laid out as early as the mid-1630s, the earliest highway in Somerville was probably what is now Washington Street, and led from present-day Sullivan Square to Harvard Square. In its earliest days, Washington Street was known as the "Road to Newtowne" (renamed Cambridge in 1638). During the 1700s and early 1800s, Washington Street, together with Somerville Avenue, comprised "Milk Row", a route favored by Middlesex County dairy farmers as the best way to get to the markets of Charlestown and Boston.

Laid out in 1636, Broadway was likely the second highway built in the area. Originally called "Menotomie's Road", it ran from the Charlestown Neck to the settlement at Menotomy (present-day Arlington). Initially bordered by farmsteads, Broadway would come into its own as a commercial thoroughfare after horse-drawn trolleys were
introduced to the highway in 1858.

Role in the Revolutionary War

Somerville was home to one of the first hostile acts of the American Revolutionary War. The removal of gunpowder by British soldiers from a powder magazine in 1774, and the massive popular reaction that ensued, are considered to be a turning point in the events leading up to war.

First built by settlers for use as a windmill in the early 1700s, the Old Powder House was sold to the colonial government of Massachusetts for use as a gunpowder magazine in 1747. Located at the intersection of Broadway and College Avenue in present-day Powder House Square, the Old Powder House held the largest supply of gunpowder in all of Massachusetts. General Thomas Gage, who had become the military governor of Massachusetts in May 1774, was charged with enforcement of the highly unpopular Intolerable Acts, which British Parliament had passed in response to the Boston Tea Party. Seeking to prevent the outbreak of war, he believed that the best way to accomplish this was by secretly removing military stores from storehouses and arsenals in New England.

Just after dawn on September 1, 1774, a force of roughly 260 British regulars from the 4th Regiment, under the command of Lieutenant Colonel George Maddison, were rowed in secrecy up the Mystic River from Boston to a landing point near Winter Hill. Most of the regulars then returned to Boston the way they had come, but a small contingent marched on to Cambridge, seizing two field pieces from the Cambridge Common. The field pieces and powder were then taken from Boston to the British stronghold on Castle Island, then known as Castle William (renamed Fort Independence in 1779).

In response to the raid, amid rumors that blood had been shed, alarm spread through the countryside as far as Connecticut and beyond, and American Patriots sprang into action, fearing that war was at hand. Thousands of militiamen began streaming toward Boston and Cambridge, and mob action forced Loyalists and some government officials to flee to the protection of the British Army. This action provided a "dress rehearsal" for the Battles of Lexington and Concord seven months later in the famous "shot heard 'round the world", and inflamed already heated feelings on both sides, spurring actions by both British and American forces to remove powder and cannon to secure locations.

After the raid on the Powder House, the colonists took action to conceal arms and munitions of war in Concord. When General Gage found out, he was resolved to take the powder by force if necessary. The Americans learned that the British intended to start for Concord on April 18, 1775, and couriers Paul Revere and William Dawes set out on their famous ride to warn the farmers and militiamen in between Boston and Concord, including Sam Adams and John Hancock. That night, he set out from the North End through Charlestown towards East Somerville. In Revere's own written account of his ride, he mentions a specific location in Somerville (then part of Charlestown). The location was the site where the executed body of a local slave known as "Mark", owned by John Codman, was publicly gibbeted and displayed for several years after his execution. The location is probably near the site of the present day Holiday Inn on Washington Street. Revere wrote "nearly opposite where Mark was hung in chains, I saw two men on Horse back, under a Tree", which he then realized were two British officers stationed on Washington Street. They immediately pursued him, and Revere galloped up Broadway towards Winter Hill and eventually eluded them. His warning gave the militia enough time to prepare for battle, and launch the American Revolution.

Shortly after Paul Revere set out on his ride, Lieutenant Colonel Francis Smith and 700 British Army regulars landed near Lechmere Square. As it was nearly high tide, East Cambridge was an island and the troops, skirting the marshes, were obliged to wade "thigh deep" to reach Somerville. They probably came through Prospect Street into Washington Street, and through Union Square.

Defeated and in retreat, the British army passed again through Somerville en route back to Boston. Upon reaching Union Square, the British marched down Washington Street as far as the base of Prospect Hill, where a skirmish took place. The handful of rebellious locals, having heard of the storied battles at Lexington and Concord earlier that day, caught an exhausted retreating British contingent off guard. As the story goes, 65-year-old minuteman James Miller lost his life in the scuffle while standing his ground against the British. He was shot thirteen times after famously telling a retreating colleague, "I am too old to run."

Somerville occupied a conspicuous position during the entire Siege of Boston, which lasted nine months, and Prospect Hill became the central position of the Continental Army's chain of emplacements north of Boston. Its height and commanding view of Boston and the harbor had tremendous strategic value and the fortress became known as the "Citadel". Originally occupied by just 400 men, Prospect Hill became a primary encampment for American forces after General Israel Putnam's retreat from the Battle of Bunker Hill. It is believed that on January 1, 1776, the Grand Union Flag flew for the first time at the Citadel, the first official raising of an American flag.

Independence, urbanization and rapid growth
With the Revolutionary War over, the residents of Somerville were able once again to devote their energies wholeheartedly to the business of making a living. From the 1780s until Somerville's separation from Charlestown in 1842, material progress was continuous, if a bit slow. As transportation infrastructure gradually transformed the area, new industries sprang up, such as brickmaking, quarrying and dairy farming.

Transportation improvements in the early to mid-1800s factored significantly in the growth of a more urban residential form and Somerville's incorporation as a City in 1872. These improvements included the opening of the Middlesex Canal through Somerville in 1803, various turnpikes such as Medford and Beacon streets, built during the 1810s and 1820s, and especially the introduction of rail lines. In 1841, the Fitchburg Railroad was built between Boston and Fresh Pond in Cambridge, paralleling the route of Somerville Avenue. This led to the establishment of industries along its path. Soon after, in 1843 the Fitchburg Railroad commenced passenger service and enabled residential development along the southern slopes of Prospect and Spring hills. By the early 1840s, the population of present-day Somerville topped 1,000 for the first time.

Despite the growth, however, discontent was growing steadily outside the "neck". The area's rural farmers paid taxes to the local government in Charlestown, but received little in return. By 1842, the area had no churches, few schools, no taverns, and suffered from poor and impassable roads. For many years after the Revolution the two parts of Charlestown styled "within" and "without the neck" were nearly equal in population; the former had by this time completely outstripped the latter. With this growth of population and trade came the need of city institutions, and consequently greater expenses were involved. Therefore, the rural part of Charlestown found herself contributing to the paving of the streets, the maintenance of a night watch, to the building of engine houses, and various other improvements from which they derived little benefit.

In 1828, a petition was presented to the Legislature asking that a part of
Charlestown be set off as a separate town, to be known as Warren. This petition was subsequently withdrawn. The desire for a separate township continued to spread, and by 1841, becoming impatient at the neglect of the government to adequately provide for their needs, the inhabitants again agitated a division of the town, and a meeting in reference to the matter was held November 22 in the Prospect Hill school house.

A petition was accordingly drawn up and signed by Guy C. Hawkins and 151 others, and a committee deputed to further its passage through the Legislature, then in session. A bill incorporating a new town was signed by the governor on March 3, 1842. The original choice for the city's new name, after breaking away from Charlestown, was Walford, after the first settler of Charlestown, Thomas Walford. However, this name was not adopted by the separation committee. Charles Miller, a member of this committee, proposed the name "Somerville", which was ultimately chosen. It was not derived from any one person's name, and a report commissioned by the Somerville Historical Society found that Somerville was a "purely fanciful name".

Before Somerville became a township in 1842 the area was primarily populated by British farmers and brick makers who sold their wares in the markets of Boston, Cambridge and Charlestown. As the markets grew, the population of Somerville increased six-fold between the years of 1842 and 1870 to 14,685. With the sharp influx of immigrants to the Somerville area, industry boomed and brick manufacturing became the predominant trade. Before mechanical presses were invented, Somerville produced 1.3 million bricks a year. Thereafter, production increased rapidly to 5.5 million bricks a year, and the success of the brickyards began to attract numerous other industries. In 1851, American Tubes Works opened, followed by meat processing and packaging plants. Other Somerville factories came to produce steam engines, boilers, household appliances, glass, and iron.

Shortly thereafter Somerville incorporated as a city in 1872. The population growth was due in part to improvements in pre-existing transportation lines, as well as a new rail line, the Lexington and Arlington Railroad, introduced through Davis Square in 1870. At its height, Somerville was served by eight passenger rail stations. Somerville's buoyant economy during this period was tied to industries that tended to locate at the periphery of the residential core, near freight rail corridors. By the mid 1870s meat packing plants were the primary employers and profit centers of the community. 

The Late Industrial Period (1870–1915) was a time of phenomenal growth for Somerville in all spheres including civic and commercial ventures. Infrastructure such as rail, water lines, telegraph and electricity were established and connected to surrounding towns. The population soared from 15,000 to 90,000. While brickmaking had taken a hold in the area after the railroads first arrived in the 1830s, Somerville's brickyards boomed through 1870. Meatpacking soon displaced brickmaking as the primary industry in the city, dubbed "The Chicago of New England". Additionally, Somerville's location adjacent to Boston and proximity to rail and road transportation made it an ideal location for distribution facilities.

It was in this period that Irish immigrants moved to Somerville to work in the brickyards and on the railroad. At the same time, older residents of East Boston and Charlestown moved to Somerville to seek a more bucolic setting than that of more densely populated areas. They also worked to maintain political control over immigrant groups, using slogans such as "Keep Somerville Republican" and establishing a local branch of the anti-Catholic American Protective Association.

Between 1915 and 1930 population growth slowed slightly as Somerville's industries consolidated rather than expanded, and the period's most important enterprises were meat packing, dairy processing, ice and food distribution. In 1920, 73% of meatpacking in Massachusetts occurred in Somerville. Construction of the McGrath Highway in 1925 marked the turning point of Somerville as an industrial city, which accelerated when the Ford Motor Company built a plant in Assembly Square in 1926. In the years that followed, Somerville would see itself transformed into a major industrial center as automobile assembly surpassed meat packing as Somerville's most important industry.

By 1930, 70% of Somerville residents had either been born outside of the United States or had parents who were. The population was then estimated to be 60% Catholic.

Although Union Square and Davis Square continued to be the largest commercial areas during the first decades of the 20th century, smaller, less-developed squares grew as well. Ball Square, Magoun Square and Teele Square were developed with one- or two-story masonry commercial buildings, and the public green at Gilman Square was surrounded by multiple four-story commercial buildings. Retail development and banking facilities also spread. During this time of industrial prosperity, continuing through World War II, the city of Somerville reached its population apex at 105,883 residents in 1940. The building boom continued until the 1940s, creating the dense residential fabric the "city of homes" is known for.

Deindustrialization and decline
By mid-century, powerful social and economic forces precipitated a period of industrial and population decline that lasted into the 1980s. The postwar period was characterized by the ascent of the private automobile, which carried significant implications for Somerville. Streetcar lines that had crisscrossed the city since 1890 were systematically ripped out and commuter rail service was discontinued at the city's eight railway stations, one by one. Passenger rail service along the Fitchburg and Lowell lines had been declining for some time, and stations such as the Winter Hill station at Gilman Square were removed as early as the late 1940s. Passenger rail service stopped altogether by 1958.

The number of cars on Somerville's streets continued to rise, and road construction projects proliferated. The Alewife Brook Parkway, Mystic Valley Parkway and the Fells Connector Parkways, originally conceived in the 1890s as a means for city residents to reach the metropolitan parks, evolved into congested commuter routes for suburban drivers. Highway projects were advanced in the wake of the Federal Highway Aid Act (1956), in some instances displacing entire neighborhoods. The Brickbottom neighborhood was razed in 1950 to prepare for a proposed Inner Belt Expressway, and construction of Interstate 93 resulted in demolition of homes in The States neighborhood during the late 1960s.

Industry slowly moved outward to the metropolitan fringes, encouraged by highway access and cheap, undeveloped land. The Ford Motor Plant in Assembly Square, which had been one of the region's largest employers, closed its doors in 1958 with severe consequences for the local economy. From the late 1950s through the early 1970s, Finast Supermarkets used the building that had earlier housed the Ford assembly plant on Middlesex Avenue, but in 1976 it too closed its doors. By 1976, Assembly Square was becoming a ghost town: Finast Stores, the Boston and Maine Railroad, and Ford Motor Company, which had each paid the city over $1 million in annual taxes, were gone. By the late 1970s, Somerville was losing population, revenue and jobs.

Somerville also has a history of racial tension. It only hired its first black police officer, a person named Francis Moore, in 1974. Moore subsequently won a suit charging that the police department was "blatantly discriminatory" against him, including an episode in which he was told to patrol the East Somerville neighborhood of Glen Park at night without his issued firearm, night stick, Mace, or communication devices. Moore's name had been written on a barrel in the neighborhood and used for target practice by local youth.

Contemporary revitalization

In the last years of the 20th century, the situation in Somerville stabilized and growth returned—first to West Somerville, and then the rest of the city.

Almost thirty years after passenger rail service to Somerville was halted, the Red Line Northwest Extension reached Davis Square in 1984. The city and community used the creation of the new station as a catalyst for revitalizing the faded square, promoting new commercial development and sponsoring other physical and infrastructural improvements. However, when the new transit station opened, business around Davis Square did not immediately thrive. The number of retail stores in the area declined from 68 in 1977 to 56 in 1987. 

However many non-retail uses, such as beauty salons and real estate offices, had already begun to fill the empty retail spaces. With the Boston area's emergence from its long recession, the area truly began to revive. Clearly, the community's vision of a rebirth of commercial and retail activity has, in the past few years, been fully realized. All benefit from their proximity to the MBTA station, with connections to Cambridge and Boston. Retail vacancy rates around the square were close to zero as of 2013.

The telecommunication and biotechnology booms of the mid-to-late 1990s significantly contributed to Somerville's revitalization. As with the housing boom a century earlier, the sudden increase in the number of jobs available in the cities of Somerville, Boston, and particularly Cambridge—as well in as the other communities immediately surrounding Somerville—led to a new surge in the demand for housing. Additionally, the end of rent control in Cambridge coincided with the economic recovery in 1995, increasing demand for Somerville's affordable housing options.
The city also had a very high car theft rate, once being the car theft capital of the country, and its Assembly Square area was especially infamous for this. However, after the gentrification period the city went through in the 1990s, and an influx of artists to the area, this name has mostly faded from use and the city has instead gained a reputation for its active arts community and effective government, including being named the best-run city in Massachusetts in 2006. Nowadays lobbying by grassroots organizations is attempting to revive and preserve Somerville's "small-town" neighborhood environments by supporting local business, public transit and gardens.

Geography

Somerville is bordered by the cities of Cambridge, Medford, Everett, Arlington and the Boston neighborhood of Charlestown. It is located on the west bank of the Mystic River.

Millennia ago, glaciation left a series of drumlins running west to east across the landscape of what would become Somerville. These ridges would later become known as the "Seven Hills" of Somerville (like many other cities claiming to be built on seven hills, following the seven hills of Rome):
 Central Hill
 Clarendon Hill
 Cobble Hill
 Ploughed Hill (or Mount Benedict)
 Prospect Hill (or Mount Pisgah)
 Spring Hill
 Winter Hill

These hills rise from the floodplain of the Mystic River, and generally run west to east, providing for beautiful vistas of Boston to the south and Medford/Everett to the north. Physical boundaries are also defined by prominent waterways: the Mystic River to the north, its tributary Alewife Brook to the west, and the Miller's River to the southeast.

Land in early Somerville was used primarily as grazing commons and small farms. After the proliferation of the railroads in the area during the mid-1800s, industrialization transformed the landscape. In the 1800s, the Millers River was used as a sewer and dumping ground for local industry and would be ordered filled by the Commonwealth before the end of the century, for health reasons. As a result of landfill and the elimination of former Cobble Hill, the Millers River marsh was turned into railyards, slaughterhouses and other large-scale land uses.

Squares and neighborhoods

Somerville's commercial property is not concentrated in a recognized downtown central business district but instead is spread over many different nodes or corridors of business activity. The difference in character ranges from the vibrant nightlife, live music and theaters of Davis Square to the large scale retail and highway access of Assembly Square. This spatial allocation is directly related to the early influence of rail and streetcar systems which caused economic activity to occur at stops. The other key factor in the creation of commercial squares is the area's topography. The numerous hills making up Somerville's landscape determined where road networks would allow neighborhood commercial development.

Somerville has a number of squares that are centers for business and entertainment, as well as a number of other neighborhoods:

 Assembly Square
 Ball Square
 Brickbottom (north of McGrath Highway, south of Inner Belt District)
 Clarendon Hill (near Broadway and Arlington border)
 Davis Square (considered West Somerville)
 Duck Village (north of Beacon Street, just west of Union Square)
 East Somerville (East of McGrath Highway, between Washington and Broadway Streets)
 Gilman Square (at the junction of Medford Street, Pearl Street, and Marshall Street)
 Inner Belt District
 Magoun Square
 Nunnery Grounds (Mount Benedict)
 Powder House Square
 Prospect Hill (part of Union Square)
 Spring Hill
 The States (streets named after U.S. states, between Broadway in East Somerville and I-93 near Assembly Square)
 Teele Square
 Ten Hills
 Tufts
 Union Square
 Wilson Square (Elm Street and Somerville Avenue), known as Oak Square before 1920
 Winter Hill

Demographics

Somerville has experienced dramatic growth since the Red Line of Boston's MBTA subway system was extended through Somerville in 1985, especially in the area between Harvard and Tufts. This was especially accelerated by the dot-com bubble of the late 90s, rising incomes, and concomitant rises in demand for urban housing.

Tensions between long-time residents and recent arrivals exist, with many of the former accusing the latter of ignoring problems such as drugs and gang violence. Incidents such as anti-"yuppie" graffiti, appearing around town in 2005, highlighting this rift. The economic clash between several areas of the city of Somerville and its neighboring cities of Boston, and in particular Cambridge, has created an underlying tension between residents that has persisted for multiple generations.

Due to Somerville's proximity to various institutions of higher education, the city has a constant influx of college students and young professionals, who reside in sections near Cambridge where Harvard University, Lesley University, and the Massachusetts Institute of Technology are located and near Tufts University, which straddles the Somerville-Medford city line. The city is inhabited by blue collar Irish American, Italian American, Greek American, and Portuguese American families, who are spread throughout the city.

In November 1997, the Utne Reader named Davis Square in Somerville one of the 15 hippest places to live in the U.S.

Somerville is home to a thriving arts community and boasts the second highest number of artists per capita in America.

Statistics

As of the 2010 census, there were 75,754 people, 33,720 households, and 14,673 families residing in the city. The racial makeup of the city was 73.92% White, 6.8% African American, 0.3% Native American, 8.7% Asian (2.7% Chinese, 2.3% Indian, 1.0% Nepalese, 0.6% Korean), 0.06% Pacific Islander, 6.67% from other races, and 3.6% were multiracial. Hispanic or Latino of any race were 10.6% of the population (4.2% Salvadoran, 1.2% Puerto Rican, 1.0% Mexican, 0.5% Guatemalan). The city regularly provides translation services and alerts into Spanish, Portuguese, Haitian Creole, and Nepali.

There were 31,555 households, out of which 18.8% had children under the age of 18 living with them, 32.2% were married couples living together, 10.3% had a female householder with no husband present, and 53.5% were non-families. 31% of all households were made up of individuals, and 8.8% had someone living alone who was 65 years of age or older. The average household size was 2.38 and the average family size was 3.06.

The population was spread out, with 14.8% under the age of 18, 15.9% from 18 to 24, 42.6% from 25 to 44, 16.2% from 45 to 64, and 10.5% who were 65 years of age or older. The median age was 31 years. For every 100 females, there were 94.9 males. For every 100 females age 18 and over, there were 93.2 males.

The median income for a household in the city was $46,315, and the median income for a family was $51,243. Males had a median income of $36,333 versus $31,418 for females. The per capita income for the city was $23,628. About 8.4% of families and 12.5% of the population were below the poverty line, including 14.3% of those under age 18 and 13.6% of those age 65 or over.

Economy
Companies based in Somerville include Gentle Giant Moving Company and Candlewick Press.

Top employers
According to Somerville's 2013 Comprehensive Annual Financial Report, the top employers in the city are:

Arts and culture

Somerville's industrial past left behind many legacies, including the invention of Marshmallow Fluff by Archibald Query. In 1914, the city became the home of the original Economy Grocery Store, which later grew into the Stop & Shop grocery chain. Two related food service chains, Steve's Ice Cream and Bertucci's, sprung from adjacent lots in Davis Square.

Davis Square is home to the Somerville Theatre, which formerly housed the Museum of Bad Art and plays host to the Independent Film Festival of Boston each spring. Union Tavern and the Crystal Ballroom are live music venues in the city.

Two major art studios, the Brickbottom Artists Building and the Joy Street Studios, are located in former industrial buildings in the Brickbottom district. The Brickbottom Artists Association has been hosting annual open studio events in the fall since 1987. Starlab Studios, a multimedia artist studio space and the host of Somerville's annual Starlabfest, opened in Union Square in 2009. Additionally, Artisan's Asylum on Tyler Street between Union and Porter squares is a hackerspace, where 150 members and 200 students have been participating in the maker culture since 2011.

The Somerville Public Library has three branches.

The Somerville Arts Council and Somerville Open Studios both host annual events involving the community in homegrown arts. The Boston chapter of the Dorkbot community meets in Somerville at the Willoughby & Baltic studio, in the Brickbottom district. Starting in 2006, an annual Fluff Festival has been held to celebrate the invention of Fluff in Somerville. "What the Fluff?" is produced by Union Square Main Streets and includes vendors, activities, entertainment and the crowning of the Pharaoh of Fluff. It has been described in food journal Gastronomica as an "orgiastic frenzy of all things fluffy--old-world village celebration meets American kitsch." Somerville mayor Joseph Curtatone attended in 2006 and declared, "My house always has been, and always will be, stocked with fluff."

Points of interest

Dilboy Stadium
George Dilboy Memorial Stadium is a multi-purpose public stadium in city. It is known as the home of the Boston Renegades women's tackle football team. It was also the home field of the Boston Militia women's tackle football team from 2008 to 2014. The Boston Breakers women's soccer club made Dilboy Stadium their home in 2012 and 2013. The stadium is named after George Dilboy, who was awarded the Medal of Honor during World War I.

Historic places
Somerville has eighty-three sites listed on the National Register of Historic Places. These places include various houses, libraries, parkways, churches, among other places, and have been declared landmarks within the city.

Somerville Museum
The Somerville Museum preserves memorabilia chronicling the city's roots, with historical and artistic exhibits. It is located at 1 Westwood Road, on the corner of Central Street.

Parks and recreation
The Somerville Community Path is a tree-lined rail trail that runs from Lowell Street to the Cambridge border near Davis Square. It connects with the Alewife Linear Park, which in turn connects with the Minuteman Bikeway and the Fitchburg Cutoff Path. Community activists hope to extend the path eastward to Lechmere Square, which would connect with the Charles River Bike Paths and the proposed East Coast Greenway. In May 2013, construction began on an extension of the path between Cedar and Lowell streets, which was completed in 2015. , the city has a total of 63 parks, playgrounds, playing fields, and community gardens.

With the establishment of the Playground Association of America in 1906, many cities, including Somerville, began to sponsor supervised playgrounds for the children of the city during the summer months. Though the Recreation Department was not formally established in Somerville until 1917, supervised play, sponsored in part by the city and the Playground Association of America, began in 1909.

The Recreation Department provides many recreational and play activities for residents of all ages, including Summertime Playgrounds, outdoor games and sports leagues, theater groups, and an active Senior Citizens Club.

Government

City government 

Somerville has a mayor-city council form of municipal government. The City Council (formerly a Board of Aldermen) consists of four at-large (citywide) positions and seven ward representatives, where each ward is a specific section of the city. The change from Aldermen to Council came in 2018 when gender equity was honored. As of January 3, 2022, the City Council compromised the following councilors:

The first Democratic mayor of the city was John J. Murphy in 1929. Every mayor prior, since 1872, had been unaffiliated with a party or Republican. Murphy succeeded on his seventh try by uniting the Irish, Italian, Greek, and Portuguese communities. There were candlelit processions with thousands marching in rallies in the middle of Union Square and other squares in the city. The current mayor of Somerville is Katjana Ballantyne.

In July 2020, the Somerville City Council voted to recognize polyamorous domestic partnerships in the city, becoming the first city in the United States to do so. This measure was passed in order to allow those in a polyamorous relationship easier access to their partners' health insurance.

Alongside these, Somerville boasts a large subsidized housing program with 1400 units and 4,328 people (5% of the population) living in them. There are 13 developments, the largest being the Mystic River Projects and Clarendon Hill Apartments.

 Mystic River Development (Winter Hill – 240 units)
 Clarendon Hill Apartments (Teele Square – 216 units)
 Mystic View Development (Winter Hill – 215 units)
 Bryant Towers (East Somerville – 134 units)
 Properzi Manor (Union Square – 110 units)
 Brady Towers (Inner Belt District – 84 units)
 Weston Manor (Teele Square – 80 units)
 Ciampa Manor (Davis Square – 53 units)
 Highland Gardens (Winter Hill – 42 units)
 Corbett Apartments (Winter Hill – 31 units)
 Hagan Manor (Union Square – 24 units)
 Waterworks Apartments (Alewife – 21 units)

Federal and state representation 

Somerville is part of Massachusetts's 7th congressional district for purposes of elections to the United States House of Representatives. It is represented by Representative Ayanna Pressley.

For representation to the Massachusetts Senate, Somerville is entirely within the Second Middlesex district. For representation to the Massachusetts House of Representatives, Somerville is part of the 26th, 27th and 34th Middlesex districts. The 26th Middlesex district includes East Somerville, Brickbottom, and a portion of the Union Square area, as well as portions of Cambridge, The 34th Middlesex district includes Winter Hill and Teele Square, as well as portions of Medford. The remainder of the city, just over half, comprises the 27th Middlesex district, which does not extend outside Somerville.

Education

The School Committee has seven independently elected officials as well as the Mayor and the President of the Board of Aldermen. The budget is approved by both the School Committee and the Board of Aldermen. The Chair is Adam Sweeting from Ward 3 and the Vice-Chair is Carrie Normand from Ward 7.

Also included in the school district is the Somerville Center for Adult Learning Experiences. The former Powder House Community School (which closed due to low enrollment in 2004) is being considered for redevelopment, either as a consolidated location for city offices if funding is obtained under the American Recovery and Reinvestment Act of 2009 or as some other type of development.

Though formally listed as being located in Medford, Tufts University is also located in Somerville. The Somerville–Medford line runs through the Tufts campus, splitting the university's Tisch Library. The school employs many local residents and has many community service projects that benefit the city, especially those run through the Leonard Carmichael Society and the Jonathan M. Tisch College of Citizenship and Public Service.

Somerville Public Schools 
Somerville Public Schools (SPS) operates ten schools from pre-kindergarten to secondary schools. The majority of the schools in Somerville (with exception of Somerville High School, Benjamin G. Brown School, Capuano Early Childhood Center, and Next Wave/Full Circle) are schools that go from kindergarten through 8th grade. There are 4,691 students enrolled in Somerville Public Schools.
 Somerville High School
 East Somerville Community School
 Arthur D. Healey School
 John F. Kennedy School
 Benjamin G. Brown School (K–5)
 West Somerville Community School
 Albert F. Argenziano School
 Winter Hill Community School
 Michael E. Capuano Early Childhood Center (pre-kindergarten)
 Next Wave/Full Circle (6–12 grades)

East Somerville Community School, which was temporarily closed after a fire in 2007, was demolished and reconstructed, reopening in fall 2013. During its closure students were transferred to the nearby Edgerly and Capuano schools.

Somerville High School underwent renovations after having been the oldest un-renovated high school in the nation. Its renovations lasted from early 2012 to January 2021.

Somerville High School 

Somerville High School (SHS) is located right next to the Somerville City Hall at 81 Highland Avenue. It is in Winter Hill near the border of East Somerville and Union Square.

Somerville High School offers a vocational program (CTE) as well as musical programs and athletics programs. It hosts roughly 1,215 students throughout 4 grades. Its student proficiency in math and science is at 73% and its proficiency for English and history is at 83%. Its student to teacher ratio is 10:1. It is in the top 20% of the state's schools composite averages. It has a graduation rate of 89.9%.

The school demographics as of 2021 are 45% Hispanic or Latino, 32% White, 14% African American, 8% Asian and 1% other. 54.6% of students in the school do not have English as their first language. 48.1% of students are economically disadvantaged. 16.9% of students have a disability.

Dilboy Stadium is where the SHS soccer, football, lacrosse, tennis and track teams compete. It is close to the Dilboy Pool (which is open solely in the summer), as well as the Clarendon Hill Towers and Clarendon Hill Projects (an installment of the Somerville Housing Authority). The SHS hockey team plays at Veterans Memorial Rink at 570 Somerville Avenue next to Conway Park and Playground.

Somerville High School is home to the student theatre group Highlander Theatre Company, which performs full-length and shorter productions every year.

Media

The city is served by a number of news sources, including:

Somerville Community Access Television
The Boston Globe
Somerville Journal (website)
The Somerville News Weekly (daily blog, despite name)
The Somerville Times (newspaper)
Scout Somerville (bimonthly magazine)

The public radio show Living on Earth is recorded in Davis Square. In addition, Candlewick Press, a major children's book printing company, is operated in Somerville.

Infrastructure

Transportation

Somerville, originally built as a streetcar suburb of Boston, has a framework and layout ideal for public transit. Its traditionally designed neighborhoods, set among grid-like street networks, connect in a walkable, transit-friendly system. Transit systems shrunk and all but disappeared as automobiles became the primary mode of transportation, however, and streetcars left the city several decades ago. The City of Somerville is serviced by the Massachusetts Bay Transit Authority (MBTA) transit service.

Rail
Davis opened in 1984, and Assembly in 2014. The Green Line stations opened in 2022 as part of the Green Line Extension, which the state was legally obligated to build since 1990. Both Porter Square station on the Red Line and Commuter Rail's Fitchburg Line in Cambridge and Sullivan Square station on the Orange Line in Boston's Charlestown neighborhood are located next to Somerville.

Road

Although only 43.6% of Somerville commuters drove alone to work in 2013, several major arteries pass through the city.

McGrath Highway is a major north–south route that represents the portion of Massachusetts Route 28 through the city of Somerville. McGrath is the continuation of Monsignor O'Brien Highway in Cambridge to the southeast and is known as the Fellsway north of the junction with Mystic Avenue and Interstate 93 in Medford. The highway has a long and complex history that hints to the changing nature of transportation throughout Somerville and the greater Boston metropolitan region. Originally constructed in 1928 to create a speedier connection for Route 28 between the Charles and Mystic Rivers, McGrath was elevated in the 1950s to further facilitate increased travel speed. The result was to cut off East Somerville and the Inner Belt District from Winter Hill and the rest of the city. When Route 28 was built, its primary purpose was to serve regional commuters traveling into Boston. However, it soon became clear that McGrath would need to be replaced by a larger and safer highway. The construction of the elevated Northern Expressway (Massachusetts), part of Interstate 93, was completed in the early 1970s and essentially rendered McGrath redundant. Today, the infrastructure of the two raised portions (the McCarthy Overpass, running from Somerville Avenue to Medford Street, and the Squires Bridge, running above the MBTA Fitchburg line near Twin City Plaza) are decaying and decrepit. In 2013, the Massachusetts Department of Transportation recommended that the McCarthy Overpass that crosses over several streets in Somerville be torn down, and proposed a boulevard-syle reconstruction with bike lanes and sidewalks for pedestrians. No date has been set for construction to begin.

Northern Expressway (Massachusetts) runs northwest and southeast through Somerville, separating Ten Hills and Assembly Square from the rest of the city. The massive elevated "Northern Expressway" was completed in the early 1970s and passes directly through Somerville running alongside and/or above Mystic Avenue (Massachusetts Route 38). Commonly referred to as the "upper and lower decks of 93", the Somerville-Charlestown section of the Northern Expressway carries three lanes of northbound traffic on the upper deck, and three lanes of southbound traffic on the lower deck. The highway also serves to cut off East Somerville from Charlestown.

Walking and cycling
Somerville is considered to be a highly walkable and bikeable city. In 2013, 7.8% of all commutes were made by bicycle, ranking Somerville 5th among U.S. cities for its share of bicycling. In 2013, 49.8% of Somerville commuters either walked, biked or used public transit. Somerville launched its first Bluebikes (originally Hubway) stations during the summer of 2012 and now hosts 21 stations.

The Somerville Community Path is a mixed-use path that runs along the old Boston and Lowell Railroad right-of-way from Davis Square across Somerville to the Cambridge border near Lechmere Square. Roughly  of the path is finished and in use. The two finished segments feature pavement interspersed with brick and surrounded by grass, trees, pedestrian connections to nearby streets, and a community garden. The path is lit at night and snowplowed in the winter.

Bus
Somerville has among the highest bus ridership in the Boston metro area. Nearly 40,000 passengers board the buses that pass through Somerville each day, and 15 MBTA bus routes operate in Somerville.

Emergency services

Somerville is protected by the 152 paid, professional firefighters of the city of Somerville Fire Department (SFD). The Somerville Fire Department currently operates out of five firehouses, located throughout the city, and operates five engine companies, three ladder companies, and one rescue company, commanded by an on-duty district chief and deputy chief each shift.

Waste

The city provides contracted trash, single-stream recycling, yard waste, and hazardous waste pickup for residents in buildings with six or fewer units, and textile recycling pickup for all residents. Single-stream recycling materials are sent to the Casella Waste Systems processing facility in neighboring Charlestown.

Notable people

 James E. Barlow, civil engineer and city manager
 Léone Boudreau-Nelson, phonetician
 Robert A. Bruce, noted cardiologist and professor
 Mike Capuano, member of the House of Representatives and mayor of Somerville
 Richard Carle, actor
 Gosder Cherilus, National Football League player
 Neil Cicierega, musician, filmmaker, and animator
 Hal Clement, author
 Mildred Codding,  medical illustrator
 Mike Colman, Ice hockey player for the 1991–1992 San Jose Sharks
 Hal Connolly, athlete, Olympic gold medalist in National Track and Field Hall of Fame
 George Dilboy, Medal of Honor recipient
 Henry F. Gilbert (1868–1928), music composer
 Nick Gomez, film director and writer
 Henry Kimball Hadley, composer and conductor
 Henry Oliver Hansen, raised the first flag in the Battle of Iwo Jima
 Hazel Heald, pulp fiction writer who collaborated on several stories with H.P. Lovecraft
 Arthur Daniel Healey, Member of the U.S. House of Representatives
 Alan Hovhaness, composer 
 James "Hutch" Hutchinson, studio musician and longtime Bonnie Raitt bassist
 Jake Kilrain, noted boxer
 Howie Long, NFL Hall of Famer, actor and sports analyst
 Martha Perry Lowe (1829–1902), poet, education activist
 Theodore Roosevelt McElroy, telegraph operator and radio telegrapher 
 Jessica Meir, astronaut
 Patricia Head Minaldi, United States District Court judge
 Connie Morella, member of the House of Representatives 
 Randall Munroe, cartoonist and writer
 Jack Parker, head coach of the Boston University Terriers hockey team, 1973–2013
 Bobby Pickett, composer of "Monster Mash"
 Harry Nelson Pillsbury, chess champion
 Alfred M. Pride, United States Navy admiral and pioneer naval aviator
 Archibald Query, inventor of Fluff
 Phil Reavis], competitor in the high jump at the 1956 Olympics
 Charles Revson, founder of  Revlon
 Reverend Leonard Grimes, abolitionist
 Alex Rocco, actor
 Paul Ryan, born in Somerville; comic artist on Fantastic Four and The Phantom
 Daniel Alfred Sanborn, a surveyor who founded the Sanborn Map Company was born in Somerville
 John Shea (playwright)
 Paul Sorrento, former Major League Baseball player
 Daniel Chapman Stillson, inventor of the modern adjustable pipe wrench
 Chris Sturniolo, Youtuber and founder of "Fresh Love Clothing"
 Matt Sturniolo, Youtuber
 Nick Sturniolo, Youtuber 
 David Foster Wallace, author
 Barbara Weeks, actress
 Winter Hill Gang, noted crime group
 Eliza Trask Hill, women's suffrage leader and prison reformer
 Aline van Barentzen, classical pianist

Sister cities
Somerville's sister cities are:
 
 Gaeta, Italy
 Nordeste, Portugal
 Tiznit, Morocco
 Yucuaiquín, El Salvador

References

Bibliography

 Drake, Samuel Adams.  History of Middlesex County, Massachusetts, Volume 1 (A-H),  Volume 2 (L-W)  published 1879 and 1880. 572 and 505 pages.  Somerville article by E.C.Booth in volume 2 pages 309–338. Somerville Fire Local 76  .
 Dutton, E.P. Chart of Boston Harbor and Massachusetts Bay with Map of Adjacent Country. Published 1867.

 Ostrander, Susan A. Citizenship and Governance in a Changing City: Somerville, MA (Temple University Press; 2013) 190 pages; study of tensions between immigrants and a new middle class in politics and community activism

 Samuels, Edward Augustus; Kimball, Henry Hastings, "Somerville, past and present: an illustrated historical souvenir", Boston : Samuels & Kimball, 1897
 Somerville, Arlington and Belmont Directory. 1869; 1873; 1876.

 Wall & Gray. 1871 Atlas of Massachusetts. Map of Massachusetts. Map of Middlesex County.

External links

 
 Somerville Chamber of Commerce

 
Cities in Massachusetts
Irish-American neighborhoods
Populated places established in 1630
Cities in Middlesex County, Massachusetts
1630 establishments in Massachusetts